Rantau Petronas is a township in Kerteh, Terengganu, Malaysia.

Kemaman District
Populated places in Terengganu